Compas, also known as compas direct or compas direk (Haitian Creole: konpa, kompa or konpa dirèk), is a modern méringue dance music genre of Haiti. The genre was popularized following the creation of Ensemble Aux Callebasses in (1955), which became Ensemble Nemours Jean-Baptiste In 1957. The frequent tours of the many Haitian bands have cemented the style in all the Caribbean. Therefore, compas is the main music of several countries such as Dominica and the French Antilles. Whether it is called zouk, where French Antilles artists of Martinique and Guadeloupe have taken it, or compas in places where Haitian artists have toured, this méringue style is influential in part of   the Caribbean, Portugal, Cape Verde, France, part of Canada, South and North America.

Etymology and characteristics
The word "Compas" means "measure" in Spanish or "rhythm", and one of the most distinctive characteristics of compas is the consistent pulsating tanbou beat, a trait common to many styles of Caribbean music. Compas Direct (which is a Trade Mark registered in the United States by Nemours Jean-Baptiste’s heirs Dr Yves Jean-Baptiste and Mrs. Yvrose Jean-Baptiste) translates as direct beat. In Creole, it is spelled konpa though it is most popularly spelled with an "m" instead of an "n". However, there is no M before B and P in Creole. Therefore kompa does not fit in any language. In addition, one only has to consult the discography of the Nemours Jean-Baptiste to ascertain the original spelling of his work which gave birth to Kizomba and Zouk.

History

Mini-jazz and small bands 
During and after the US occupation, the word jazz has become synonymous with music bands in Haiti. So the mini-jazz is a reduced méringue-compas band. The movement started in the mid-1960s when young small neighborhood bands played compas featuring paired electric guitars, electric bass, drum set-conga-timbales and 2 cowbells, 1 for the timbales and the other to be played with the floor tom ; some use an alto sax or a full horn section, others use a keyboard, accordion This trend, launched by Shleu-Shleu after 1965, came to include a number of groups from Port-au-Prince neighbourhoods, especially the suburb of Pétion-Ville. Les Corvington, Tabou Combo, Les Difficiles, Les Loups Noirs, Les Frères DéJean, Les Fantaisistes de Carrefour, Bossa Combo and Les Ambassadeurs (among others) formed the core of this middle-class popular music movement.

These young musicians were critical in the creation of new technics that contribute to the fanciness of the style. Although Raymond Gaspard (Nemours) had already started it in the 1950s, however, guitar players such as Michel Corvington (Les Corvington), Henry Celestin (founder of Les Difficiles de Pétion Ville), Robert Martino (Les Difficiles/Gypsies/Scorpio/Topvice...), Dadou Pasket (Tabou combo/Magnum Band), Jean Claude Jean (Tabou Combo/Super Star...), Serge Rosenthal (Shleu-Shleu), Hans Felix, (Les Ambassadeurs/Volo Volo de Boston), Ricardo/Tiplum (Les Ambassadeurs) Claude Marcellin (Les Difficiles/D.P. Express/Zèklè...), Police Nozile (Les Frères Déjean/D.P. Express...) and many more have created intricate mostly rhythmic guitar styles that constitute a strong distinguishable feature of the méringue.

Nemours Jean-Baptiste 
Nemours Jean-Baptiste presented his "Ensemble Aux Calebasses" in 1955 (named after the club "Aux Calebasses" located at Carrefour, a western neighborhood of Port-au-Prince; Haiti's capital where the band used to perform on weekends). At the beginning (1955), Ensemble ‘Aux Callebasses‘ Of Nemours Jean-Baptiste played rhythms such as Cuba's Guaracha and Cha Cha Cha as well as Haiti's Bannann Pouyak, Grenn Moudong, and Méringue Lente. In 1957, Nemours Jean-Baptiste -with the assistance of conga player Kreudzer Duroseau ans accordionist Richard Duroseau- created compas which has its roots in Haitian traditional Meringue and the Vodou traditional rhythms. Its  popularity took off likely due to the genre's ability to improvise and hold the rhythm section steady and the facility with which dancers could absorb, feel and express the new rhythm. Nemours Jean-Baptiste incorporated a lot of brass and, in 1958, the first electric guitar in Haitian urban dance music. Compas is sung in Creole, English, Spanish, French, and Portuguese. Nemours' popularity grew in and out of the country. The bands clean horn section was remarkable and the band featured méringue tunes that gained instant popularity. For example, in Martinique, several music groups such as Ensemble Abricot, Les Djoubap, Combo Jazz, Georges Plonquitte (fr) (Vini Dance Compas Direct) conquered the public with the many tunes or compositions of Nemours. Later Nemours became a favorite of Dominican president, Joaquín Balaguer who often contracted the band. This is why hits like "Ti Carole", "Chagrin D'amour" featured by known Dominican stars Luis Miguel and others are also sung in Spanish.

Rise in popularity 
In the early 1960s Nemours and the Sicot Brothers from Haiti frequently toured the Caribbean, especially Curaçao, Aruba, Saint Lucia, Dominica and mostly the French Islands of Martinique & Guadeloupe to spread the seed of the méringue-compas and cadence rampa. Webert Sicot, a prominent Haitian saxophone player and the originator of cadence rampa, recorded three LP albums with French Antilles producers, two with Celini disques in Guadeloupe and one with "Balthazar" in Martinique. Haitian compas or cadence bands were asked to integrate Antillean musicians. Consequently, the leading Les Guais Troubadours with influential singer, Louis Lahens, along other bands, played a very important role in the schooling of Antilleans to the méringue-compas or cadence rampa music style. Almost all existing Haitian compas bands have toured these islands that have since adopted the music and the dance of the méringue.

From 1968 to the 1970s prominent bands like Bossa Combo, Volo Volo de Boston, Les Shleu-Shleu, Les Ambassadeurs, Les Vikings, Les Fantaisistes, Les Loups Noirs, Les Frères Dejean, Les Difficiles, and Les Gypsies have exerted a dominance on the Caribbean and many places in Europe and South America musical scene.  The band Tabou Combo, perhaps one of the most legendary compas ensembles, took the musical style to greater heights when they toured countries like Senegal and Japan during their world tours. Their performances in Panama enamored the population, earning them the title of "Official Panamanian Band". The band's impact on local Panamanian music was so profound that to this day, Panamanians still consider compas (or what they call, "reggae haitiano") as part of their national music. Throughout the seventies, Tabou Combo remained on the Paris Hits Parade for weeks with their "New York City" album, and held performances attended by thousands in New York's Central Park.. During the 80s, popular artist, Gesner Henry, alias Coupe Cloue and his band Trio Select, successively toured West Africa and left sweet memories today again. He was crowned King. Another band, Orchestre Septentrional D'Haïti (or the Northern Orchestra of Haiti) also had a lot of popularity during this time period and cemented the style of large orchestras as part of the northern signature of compas.

Dance style
The dance-style that accompanied compas in 1957, is a two-step dance called carré (square) introduced by Nemours Jean-Baptiste in 1962. As a méringue, a ballroom dance, compas is danced in pairs. Sometimes partners dance holding each other tightly and romantically; in this case often most of the moves are made at the hips.

Derivatives of Compas

Zouk
Zouk was an attempt to develop a proper local music that would lessen or even eradicate the meringue-cadence or compas influence from the French islands. When the MIDI technology came out, Kassav' used it fully, creating new sound in both their fast carnival beat and compas. The Antilleans were all over with zouk but as other bands from the Caribbean and Africa added the MIDI technology to their music people got used to it. Because it was a jump up beat the fast zouk béton faded away In the same 1980s and Antilleans would continue to play and dance meringue-cadence or compas. After all, French Antilleans and Dominicans are important players of the style. However, the problem is that musicians from Martinique and Guadeloupe have calculatedly labeled compas as zouk in order to remain on the map (keeping in mind compas was created in 1950 by Haitians); creating a big confusion in Africa, Cabo Verde, Angola, Bresil, Portugal and other places. Kassav', the originator of the zouk béton, is a compas music band that has taken compas to many places, and is the only band that continues to include zouk béton in its repertoire, though to a lesser extent.

Coladeira
There is a strong compas influence in Cape Verdean music. During the 1960s-1980s Haitian artists and bands such as Claudette & Ti Pierre, Tabou Combo and mostly Gesner Henry alias Coupe Cloue and the Dominican group Exile One were very popular in Africa. In addition, the French Antilles Kassav and other French Antillean musicians, whose main music is compas, toured Cabo island on various occasions. Many Cape Verdean artists feature compas. Talented Tito Paris dança mami Criola (1994) is a good example; this CD featured music close to Haiti Tabou Combo, Caribbean Sextet, Tropicana and French Antilles Kassav, etc. Cape Verdeans artists have been exposed to compas in the US and France. Today the new generation of Cape Verdean artists features a light compas close to Haitian and French Antillean. Until Haitian musicians could tour Cabo Verde, compas that was promoted as zouk by French Antillean artists would not as popular.

See also
 Cadence rampa
 Cadence-lypso
 Caribbean music
 Haitian Carnival
 Méringue
 Music of Latin America

References

Un panorama de l'histoire de la musique haïtienne 

20th-century music genres
Haitian styles of music